Ayyan may refer to:
 Ayyan (film)
 Ayyan (model)